William Shea (1907–1991) was an American lawyer and baseball league founder.

William Shea may also refer to:

William Shea (actor) (1856–1918), British actor
William J. Shea (1900–1965), justice of the Connecticut Supreme Court
William ("Bill") H. Shea (1932–2020), US physician, archaeologist, Bible Studies specialist

See also
William O'Shea (1840–1905), Irish soldier and Member of Parliament
William O'Shea (boxer) (fl. 1920s), Irish Olympic boxer
William Shay, namesake of the William Shay Double House in New Hamburg, New York